William Ludlow (November 27, 1843 – August 30, 1901) was an officer in the Corps of Engineers and a major general in the United States Army who served in the Civil War, Plains Indian Wars, the Spanish–American War, and led a scientific expedition examining the natural wonders of Yellowstone National Park.

Early life
Ludlow was born in Islip, Suffolk County, New York, the son of William H. Ludlow and Frances Louisa Nicoll Ludlow. He received his education at University of the City of New York and the United States Military Academy. He graduated in 1864, during the height of the Civil War, and was commissioned in the Corps of Engineers.

Civil War

Ludlow served under Maj. Gen. Joseph Hooker in the Atlanta Campaign, and was appointed a brevet captain for gallantry at the Battle of Peachtree Creek. He was on the staff of Maj. Gen. William T. Sherman in both the March to the Sea and the Carolinas Campaign. In March 1865, he was appointed a brevet lieutenant colonel.

Postbellum service

After the Civil War, Ludlow devoted his life to a military career, serving in engineering and scientific capacities in the Dakota Territory, Washington, D.C., and in river and harbor management in Philadelphia, the Great Lakes, Nicaragua and New York City. As Chief Engineer of Dakota Territory, he oversaw mapping and data collection of the 7th Cavalry's 1874 expedition into the Black Hills of what is now South Dakota. In 1884, he was elected as a member to the American Philosophical Society. In Washington, DC he was the military commissioner for the District of Columbia from 1886 to 1888. In May 1898, he was appointed a brigadier general of volunteers and Chief Engineer of the armies in the field. He commanded the 1st Brigade in Henry W. Lawton's division during the battle of El Caney and the siege of Santiago. Later he was the military governor of Santiago and commanded the Department of Havana. In September 1898 he was appointed a major general of volunteers. In April, 1901, Ludlow was sent to the Philippines. He briefly commanded the Department of the Visayas before being returned to the U.S. at the end of June, 1901, due to the discovery of advancing pulmonary tuberculosis he had contracted in Cuba.

Ludlow died in Convent, Morris County, New Jersey, on August 30, 1901, and is buried in Arlington National Cemetery.

In 1904, Washington DC named William Ludlow Elementary School for him. It has since been combined with Zachary Taylor Elementary to form Ludlow-Taylor Elementary School.

Integrity in service
A story published in an 1884 issue of the "Engineering News and American Contract Journal" featured Ludlow as an example of integrity in Army and civil service.

In fiction
A highly fictionalized William Ludlow is featured in the novel by Jim Harrison and film Legends of the Fall. In one scene (at 25 min, 24 sec), the book Report of a Reconnaissance of the Black Hills of Dakota (which is an actual book authored by the real William Ludlow) is shown and referred to as the work of the fictional William Ludlow. In the film he is portrayed by Anthony Hopkins.

Named for
Ludlow, South Dakota, a tiny hamlet in northwestern South Dakota, is named for him.

See also

 William H. Illingworth

References

External links
 William Ludlow
 US Army Corps of Engineers – Historical Vignettes
 William LUDLOW/Genevieve Almira SPRIGG at The Pennocks of Primitive Hall.
 
 

United States Army generals
People of the Spanish–American War
American conservationists
American explorers
People of New York (state) in the American Civil War
Burials at Arlington National Cemetery
United States Military Academy alumni
1843 births
1901 deaths
Members of the American Philosophical Society